Domoprednate (brand name Stermonid; developmental code name Ro 12-7024) is a synthetic glucocorticoid corticosteroid which was developed in the late 1970s and 1980s.

References

Cyclohexanols
Butyrate esters
Diketones
Esters
Glucocorticoids
Pregnanes
Enones